Abdullah Ercan (born 8 December 1971 in Istanbul, Turkey) is a retired Turkish international footballer and manager.

Coaching career

Honours

Trabzonspor
Turkish Cup: 1992, 1995
Turkish Super Cup: 1995
Chancellor Cup: 1994, 1996

Fenerbahçe
Süper Lig: 2000–01

Turkey
FIFA World Cup third place: 2002

References

External links
 

1971 births
Living people
Footballers from Istanbul
Association football defenders
Turkish footballers
Turkey international footballers
Turkey under-21 international footballers
Turkey youth international footballers
Trabzonspor footballers
Fenerbahçe S.K. footballers
Galatasaray S.K. footballers
İstanbulspor footballers
2002 FIFA World Cup players
UEFA Euro 1996 players
UEFA Euro 2000 players
Süper Lig players
Süper Lig managers
Mediterranean Games gold medalists for Turkey
Mediterranean Games medalists in football
Competitors at the 1993 Mediterranean Games
Turkish football managers